Neodaruma tamanukii is a moth in the family Drepanidae and the only species in the genus Neodaruma. The species and genus were described by Shōnen Matsumura in 1933. It is found in China (Inner Mongolia), south-eastern Russia and Japan.

References

Moths described in 1933
Thyatirinae
Monotypic moth genera
Moths of Asia
Drepanidae genera